Esther Oyema (born 20 April 1982) is a Nigerian powerlifter.

Oyema competed in the women's 61 kg event at the 2014 Commonwealth Games where she won a gold medal and set a new world record by lifting 122.4 kg in the heavyweight category. In 2015 she won a gold medal at the All-Africa Games by lifting 133 kg and beating her previous record 126 kg. In the same year she traveled all the way to Almaty, Kazakhstan where she won another gold medal at the IPC Powerlifting Asian Open Championships by lifting 79 kg. During the 2016 Summer Paralympics she won a silver medal by beating her Mexican counterpart Amalia Perez in the women's 55 kg lifting. She won a gold medal and created a new world record of 131 kg in the women's lightweight event at the 2018 Commonwealth games.

On May 21, 2020, the International Paralympic Committee (IPC) banned her for four years after failing a doping test. She competed at the 2019 International Paralympic competition held at the Oriental Hotel, Victoria Island in Lagos, where she won another gold medal, but this was later forfeited Her urine sample was collected by the IPC during the competition and she  tested positive for 19-norandrosterone.

References

1982 births
Living people
Nigerian female weightlifters
Medalists at the 2012 Summer Paralympics
Medalists at the 2016 Summer Paralympics
Powerlifters at the 2012 Summer Paralympics
Powerlifters at the 2016 Summer Paralympics
Paralympic silver medalists for Nigeria
Paralympic gold medalists for Nigeria
Commonwealth Games gold medallists for Nigeria
Powerlifters at the 2010 Commonwealth Games
Powerlifters at the 2014 Commonwealth Games
Female powerlifters
Commonwealth Games medallists in powerlifting
African Games gold medalists for Nigeria
African Games medalists in weightlifting
Competitors at the 2015 African Games
Paralympic medalists in powerlifting
Paralympic powerlifters of Nigeria
Nigerian powerlifters
20th-century Nigerian women
21st-century Nigerian women
Powerlifters at the 2018 Commonwealth Games
Medallists at the 2010 Commonwealth Games
Medallists at the 2014 Commonwealth Games
Medallists at the 2018 Commonwealth Games